Arappavan is a 1961 Indian Malayalam film, directed by K. Shankar and produced by K. Kumar. The film stars Sathyan, KPAC Sulochana, Kedamangalam Sadanandan and Pattom Sadan. The film had musical score by G. K. Venkitesh and P. S. Divakar.

Cast
 
Sathyan as Vettukaaran Ramu 
KPAC Sulochana as Muthalali's Wife 
Kedamangalam Sadanandan 
Pattom Sadan as Paramu's Brother 
T. S. Muthaiah as Paramu 
Prem Nawas as Bhasi 
Ambika as Kalyani 
GK Pillai as Muthalali 
Kalaikkal Kumaran 
T. R. Omana 
S. P. Pillai as Raphael Mappila 
K. V. Shanthi as Ammini 
Sree Narayana Pillai

Soundtrack
The music was composed by G. K. Venkitesh and P. S. Divakar and lyrics were written by Kedamangalam Sadanandan.

References

External links
 

1961 films
1960s Malayalam-language films
Films scored by G. K. Venkatesh
Films directed by K. Shankar